Veronica aphylla, common name leafless stemmed speedwell, is a plant belonging to the family Plantaginaceae.

Description
It is a perennial herbaceous plant with a single, erect, cylindrical, hairy, greenish, flowering stem. Flowers have four blue light petals with darker nerves and two long stamens. They bloom from July to August.

Distribution
This species is native to the mountains of Central and Southern Europe (Alps, Jura, Carpathians, Iberian Peninsula and the Balkans).

Habitat

References
Biolib
Acta Plantarum
Luirig.altervista

Flora of Europe
agrestis
Plants described in 1753
Taxa named by Carl Linnaeus